In microeconomic theory, the opportunity cost of a choice is the value of the best alternative forgone where, given limited resources, a choice needs to be made between several mutually exclusive alternatives. Assuming the best choice is made, it is the "cost" incurred by not enjoying the benefit that would have been had by taking the second best available choice. The New Oxford American Dictionary defines it as "the loss of potential gain from other alternatives when one alternative is chosen." As a representation of the relationship between scarcity and choice, the objective of opportunity cost is to ensure efficient use of scarce resources. It incorporates all associated costs of a decision, both explicit and implicit. Thus, opportunity costs are not restricted to monetary or financial costs: the real cost of output forgone, lost time, pleasure, or any other benefit that provides utility should also be considered an opportunity cost.

Types of opportunity costs

Explicit costs
Explicit costs are the direct costs of an action (business operating costs or expenses), executed through either a cash transaction or a physical transfer of resources. In other words, explicit opportunity costs are the out-of-pocket costs of a firm, that are easily identifiable. This means explicit costs will always have a dollar value and involve a transfer of money, e.g. paying employees. With this said, these particular costs can easily be identified under the expenses of a firm's income statement and balance sheet to represent all the cash outflows of a firm.

Examples are as follows:

 Land and infrastructure costs
 Operation and maintenance costs—wages, rent, overhead, materials

Scenarios are as follows:

 If a person leaves work for an hour and spends $200 on office supplies, then the explicit costs for the individual equates to the total expenses for the office supplies of $200.
 If a printer of a company malfunctions, then the explicit costs for the company equates to the total amount to be paid to the repair technician.

Implicit costs
Implicit costs (also referred to as implied, imputed or notional costs) are the opportunity costs of utilising resources owned by the firm that could be used for other purposes. These costs are often hidden to the naked eye and aren’t made known. Unlike explicit costs, implicit opportunity costs correspond to intangibles. Hence, they cannot be clearly identified, defined or reported. This means that they are costs that have already occurred within a project, without exchanging cash. This could include a small business owner not taking any salary in the beginning of their tenure as a way for the business to be more profitable. As implicit costs are the result of assets, they are also not recorded for the use of accounting purposes because they do not represent any monetary losses or gains. In terms of factors of production, implicit opportunity costs allow for depreciation of goods, materials and equipment that ensure the operations of a company.

Examples of implicit costs regarding production are mainly resources contributed by a business owner which includes:

 Human labour
 Infrastructure
 Time

Scenarios are as follows:

 If a person leaves work for an hour to spend $200 on office supplies, and has an hourly rate of $25, then the implicit costs for the individual equates to the $25 that he/she could have earned instead.
 If a printer of a company malfunctions, the implicit cost equates to the total production time that could have been utilized if the machine did not break down.

Excluded from opportunity cost

Sunk costs 

Sunk costs (also referred to as historical costs) are costs that have been incurred already and cannot be recovered. As sunk costs have already been incurred, they remain unchanged and should not influence present or future actions or decisions regarding benefits and costs. Decision makers who recognise the insignificance of sunk costs then understand that the "consequences of choices cannot influence choice itself".

From the traceability source of costs, sunk costs can be direct costs or indirect costs. If the sunk cost can be summarized as a single component, it is a direct cost; if it is caused by several products or departments, it is an indirect cost.

Analyzing from the composition of costs, sunk costs can be either fixed costs or variable costs. When a company abandons a certain component or stops processing a certain product, the sunk cost usually includes fixed costs such as rent for equipment and wages, but it also includes variable costs due to changes in time or materials. Usually, fixed costs are more likely to constitute sunk costs.

Generally speaking, the stronger the liquidity, versatility, and compatibility of the asset, the less its sunk cost will be.

A scenario is given below:

A company used $5,000 for marketing and advertising on its music streaming service to increase exposure to the target market and potential consumers. In the end, the campaign proved unsuccessful. The sunk cost for the company equates to the $5,000 that was spent on the market and advertising means. This expense is to be ignored by the company in its future decisions and highlights that no additional investment should be made.

Despite the fact that sunk costs should be ignored when making future decisions, people sometimes make the mistake of thinking sunk cost matters. This is sunk cost fallacy.

Example：Steven bought a game for $100, but when he started to play it, he found it was boring rather than interesting. But Steven thinks he paid $100 for the game, so he has to play it through.

Sunk cost: $100 and the cost of the time spent playing the game. Analysis: Steven spent $100 hoping to complete the whole game experience, and the game is an entertainment activity, but there is no pleasure during the game, which is already low efficiency, but Steven also chose to waste time. So it is adding more cost.

Marginal cost

The concept of marginal cost in economics is the incremental cost of each new product produced for the entire product line. For example, if you build a plane, it costs a lot of money, but when you build the 100th plane, the cost will be much lower. When building a new aircraft, the materials used may be more useful, so make as many aircraft as possible from as few materials as possible to increase the margin of profit. Marginal cost is abbreviated MC or MPC.

Marginal cost: The increase in cost caused by an additional unit of production is called marginal cost. By definition, marginal cost is equal to change in total cost (TC) (△TC) divided by the corresponding change in output (△Q) : Change in total cost/change in output: MC(Q)=△TC(Q)/△Q or MC(Q)=lim=△TC(Q)/△Q=dTC/dQ(△Q→0) (as shown in Figure 1)

In theory marginal costs represent the increase in total costs (which include both constant and variable costs) as output increases by 1 unit.

Use of opportunity cost

Economic profit versus accounting profit 
The main objective of accounting profits is to give an account of a company’s fiscal performance, typically reported on in quarters and annually. As such, accounting principles focus on tangible and measurable factors associated with operating a business such as wages and rent, and thus, do not “…infer anything about relative economic profitability.” Opportunity costs are not considered in accounting profits as they have no purpose in this regard.

The purpose of calculating economic profits (and thus, opportunity costs) is to aid in better business decision-making through the inclusion of opportunity costs. In this way, a business can evaluate whether its decision and the allocation of its resources is cost-effective or not and whether resources should be reallocated.

Economic profit does not indicate whether or not a business decision will make money. It signifies if it is prudent to undertake a specific decision against the opportunity of undertaking a different decision. As shown in the simplified example in the image, choosing to start a business would provide $10,000 in terms of accounting profits. However, the decision to start a business would provide -$30,000 in terms of economic profits, indicating that the decision to start a business may not be prudent as the opportunity costs outweigh the profit from starting a business. In this case, where the revenue is not enough to cover the opportunity costs, the chosen option may not be the best course of action. When economic profit is zero, all the explicit and implicit costs (opportunity costs) are covered by the total revenue and there is no incentive for reallocation of the resources. This condition is known as normal profit.

Several performance measures of economic profit have been derived to further improve business decision-making such as risk-adjusted return on capital (RAROC) and economic value added (EVA), which directly include a quantified opportunity cost to aid businesses in risk management and optimal allocation of resources. Opportunity cost, as such, is an economic concept in economic theory which is used to maximise value through better decision-making.

In accounting, collecting, processing, and reporting information on activities and events that occur within an organization is referred to as the accounting cycle. To encourage decision-makers to efficiently allocate the resources they have (or those who have trusted them), this information is being shared with them. As a result, the role of accounting has evolved in tandem with the rise of economic activity and the increasing complexity of economic structure. Accounting is not only the gathering and calculation of data that impacts a choice, but it also delves deeply into the decision-making activities of businesses through the measurement and computation of such data. In accounting, it is common practice to refer to the opportunity cost of a decision (option) as a cost. The discounted cash flow method has surpassed all others as the primary method of making investment decisions, and opportunity cost has surpassed all others as an essential metric of cash outflow in making investment decisions. For various reasons, the opportunity cost is critical in this form of estimation.

First and foremost, the discounted rate applied in DCF analysis is influenced by an opportunity cost, which impacts project selection and the choice of a discounting rate. Using the firm's original assets in the investment means there is no need for the enterprise to utilize funds to purchase the assets, so there is no cash outflow. However, the cost of the assets must be included in the cash outflow at the current market price. Even though the asset does not result in a cash outflow, it can be sold or leased in the market to generate income and be employed in the project's cash flow. The money earned in the market represents the opportunity cost of the asset utilized in the business venture. As a result, opportunity costs must be incorporated into project planning to avoid erroneous project evaluations. Only those costs directly relevant to the project will be considered in making the investment choice, and all other costs will be excluded from consideration. Modern accounting also incorporates the concept of opportunity cost into the determination of capital costs and capital structure of businesses, which must compute the cost of capital invested by the owner as a function of the ratio of human capital. In addition, opportunity costs are employed to determine to price for asset transfers between industries.

Comparative advantage versus absolute advantage 
When a nation, organisation or individual can produce a product or service at a relatively lower opportunity cost compared to its competitors, it is said to have a comparative advantage. In other words, a country has comparative advantage if it gives up less of a resource to make the same number of products as the other country that has to give up more.

Using the simple example in the image, to make 100 tonnes of tea, Country A has to give up the production of 20 tonnes of wool which means for every 1 tonne of tea produced, 0.2 tonne of wool has to be forgone. Meanwhile, to make 30 tonnes of tea, Country B needs to sacrifice the production of 100 tonnes of wool, so for each tonne of tea, 3.3 tonnes of wool is forgone. In this case, Country A has a comparative advantage over Country B for the production of tea because it has a lower opportunity cost. On the other hand, to make 1 tonne of wool, Country A has to give up 5 tonnes of tea, while Country B would need to give up 0.3 tonnes of tea, so Country B has a comparative advantage over the production of wool.

Absolute advantage on the other hand refers to how efficiently a party can use its resources to produce goods and services compared to others, regardless of its opportunity costs. For example, if Country A can produce 1 tonne of wool using less manpower compared to Country B, then it is more efficient and has an absolute advantage over wool production, even if it does not have a comparative advantage because it has a higher opportunity cost (5 tonnes of tea).

Absolute advantage refers to how efficiently resources are used whereas comparative advantage refers to how little is sacrificed in terms of opportunity cost. When a country produces what it has the comparative advantage of, even if it does not have an absolute advantage, and trades for those products it does not have a comparative advantage over, it maximises its output since the opportunity cost of its production is lower than its competitors. By focusing on specialising this way, it also maximises its level of consumption.

Opportunity cost at governmental level 
Much like individual decisions, it is often the case that governments must consider opportunity cost when enacting legislation. Taking universal basic healthcare as an example, the opportunity cost at the government level is quite clear. Assume that implementing basic healthcare would cost a government $1 billion: the explicit opportunity cost to implement such legislation would be a combined $1 billion that could have been spent on education, housing, transport infrastructure, environmental protection, or military defence, for example. For this particular scenario, the implicit cost is quite minimal. Only the cost of producing such legislation through human labour and the time of production would need to be accounted for.

While the previous situation’s implicit cost may have been somewhat negligible at a government level, this is not true for all scenarios. Using hijacking prevention methods following the September 11 attacks as an example, the additional burden of implicit costs is evident. To implement more sophisticated airport security systems, the United States government estimated the cost to be around $2 billion. An additional $450 million would be spent to reinforce plane doors, along with an extra $3 billion spent on sky marshals for all American flights to help further prevent future hijackings from taking place. Under this scenario, the explicit cost would be $5.45 billion. Implicit costs, however, would far outweigh this. The US government has calculated that by waiting an additional 30 minutes due to extra airport security, multiplied by an average of 800 million passengers per year with the average cost of time at $20 per hour, the total implicit cost to the US economy from such prevention methods would be upwards of $8 billion. Thus the importance of recognising the opportunity cost at a governmental level is crucial in efficiently allocating government funds.

The impact of the Covid-19 pandemic that broke out in recent years on economic operations is unavoidable, the economic risks are not symmetrical, and the impact of Covid-19 is distributed differently in the global economy. Some industries have benefited from the pandemic, while others have almost gone bankrupt. One of the sectors most impacted by the COVID-19 pandemic is the public and private health system. Opportunity cost is the concept of ensuring efficient use of scarce resources, a concept that is central to health economics. The massive increase in the need for intensive care has largely limited and exacerbated the department's ability to address routine health problems. The sector must consider opportunity costs in decisions related to the allocation of scarce resources, premised on improving the health of the population.

However, the opportunity cost of implementing policies to the sector has limited impact in the health sector. Patients with severe symptoms of COVID-19 require close monitoring in the ICU and in therapeutic ventilator support, which is key to treating the disease. In this case, scarce resources include bed days, ventilation time, and therapeutic equipment. Temporary excess demand for hospital beds from patients exceeds the number of bed days provided by the health system. The increased demand for days in bed is due to the fact that infected hospitalized patients stay in bed longer, shifting the demand curve to the right (see curve D2 in Graph1.11). The number of bed days provided by the health system may be temporarily reduced as there may be a shortage of beds due to the widespread spread of the virus. If this situation becomes unmanageable, supply decreases and the supply curve shifts to the left (curve S2 in Graph1.11). A perfect competition model can be used to express the concept of opportunity cost in the health sector. In perfect competition, market equilibrium is understood as the point where supply and demand are exactly the same (points P and Q in Graph1.11). The balance is Pareto optimal equals marginal opportunity cost. Medical allocation may result in some people being better off and others worse off. At this point, it is assumed that the market has produced the maximum outcome associated with the Pareto partial order. As a result, the opportunity cost increases when other patients cannot be admitted to the ICU due to a shortage of beds.

See also 

Austrian School
Best alternative to a negotiated agreement
Budget constraint
Economies of scale
Econometrics
Fear of missing out
Production–possibility frontier
Reduced cost aka 'opportunity cost' in linear programming
There ain't no such thing as a free lunch
Time management
Trade-off
Transaction cost
You can't have your cake and eat it
Perverse subsidies

References

External links

 The Opportunity Cost of Economics Education by Robert H. Frank

Costs
Economics and time